Nimeh Kar (also Romanized as Nīmeh Kār and Nīmehkār) is a village in Kohurestan Rural District, in the Central District of Khamir County, Hormozgan Province, Iran. At the 2006 census, its population was 1,557, in 313 families.

References 

Populated places in Khamir County